Eugene Sanders (born 11 October 1972) is a South African-born, New Zealand cricket umpire. He has stood in domestic matches in the 2017–18 Plunket Shield season and the 2016–17 Ford Trophy. He also stood in domestic match in 2017–18 Super Smash.

He has stood as an umpire in international matches featuring the New Zealand women's cricket team.

References

External links
 

1972 births
Living people
New Zealand cricket umpires
Sportspeople from Cape Town